Chengjiao may refer to:

Zhao Chengjiao ( 3rd century BC), prince of Qin during the Warring States period who later defected to Zhao

Subdistricts
Chengjiao Subdistrict, Guangzhou, in Conghua District, Guangzhou, Guangdong, China
Chengjiao Subdistrict, Ningxiang County, in Ningxiang County, Hunan, China
Chengjiao Subdistrict, Ulan Hot, in Ulan Hot, Inner Mongolia, China
Chengjiao Subdistrict, Yushu, in Yushu, Jilin, China
Chengjiao Subdistrict, Guangshui, in Guangshui, Suizhou, Hubei, China

Towns
Chengjiao, Shaowu, in Shaowu, Fujian, China
Chengjiao, Linxia, in Linxia, Gansu, China
Chengjiao, Shenyang, in Liaozhong District, Shenyang, Liaoning, China

Townships
Chengjiao Township, Longyan, in Yongding District, Longyan, Fujian, China
Chengjiao Township, Ninghua County, in Ninghua County, Fujian, China
Chengjiao Township, Zherong County, in Zherong County, Fujian, China
Chengjiao Township, Gansu, in Wudu County, Longnan, Gansu, China
Chengjiao Township, Heilongjiang, in Bei'an, Heilongjiang, China
Chengjiao Township, Suizhong County, in Suizhong County, Liaoning, China
Chengjiao Township, Dancheng County, in Dancheng County, Henan, China
Chengjiao Township, Fugou County, in Fugou County, Henan, China
Chengjiao Township, Gushi County, in Gushi County, Henan, China
Chengjiao Township, Linzhou, in Linzhou, Henan, China
Chengjiao Township, Luoning County, in Luoning County, Henan, China
Chengjiao Township, Nanzhao County, in Nanzhao County, Henan, China
Chengjiao Township, Ningling County, in Ningling County, Henan, China
Chengjiao Township, Qi County, in Qi County (Kaifeng), Henan, China
Chengjiao Township, Sheqi County, in Sheqi County, Henan, China
Chengjiao Township, Sui County, in Sui County, Henan, China
Chengjiao Township, Taikang County, in Taikang County, Henan, China
Chengjiao Township, Tanghe County, in Tanghe County, Henan, China
Chengjiao Township, Tongbai County, in Tongbai County, Henan, China
Chengjiao Township, Weihui, in Weihui, Henan, China
Chengjiao Township, Xi County, in Xi County, Henan, China
Chengjiao Township, Xinye County, in Xiney County, Henan, China
Chengjiao Township, Yucheng County, in Yucheng County, Henan, China
Chengjiao Township, Hubei, in Guangshui, Hubei, China
Chengjiao Township, Chenxi County, in Chenxi County, Hunan, China
Chengjiao Township, Miluo, in Miluo, Hunan, China
Chengjiao Township, Rucheng County, in Rucheng County, Hunan, China
Chengjiao Township, Yongxing County, in Yongxing County, Hunan, China
Chengjiao Township, Sichuan, in Fucheng District, Mianyang, Sichuan, China